Rankin High School is a public high school located in Rankin, Texas (USA) and classified as a 1A school by the UIL. It is part of the Rankin Independent School District located in southeastern Upton County

Athletics
The Rankin Red Devils compete in these sports - 

Basketball
Cross Country
6-Man Football
Golf
Powerlifting
Tennis
Track and Field
Volley Ball
Marching Band

State Titles
Boys Golf - 
1973(1A), 1974(1A), 1975(1A), 1976(1A), 1977(1A)
Girls Golf - 
1978(1A), 2012(1A)
One Act Play - 
1959(B), 1960(B), 1961(1A), 2021(1A)

State Finalist
Football - 
1980(1A)

Notable alumni

Paul Patterson, author and educator

References

External links
Rankin ISD
List of Six-man football stadiums in Texas

Public high schools in Texas
Education in Upton County, Texas